John W. Daniels (February 23, 1857 – June 8, 1931) was an American businessman. He was the co-founder and chairman of Archer Daniels Midland.

Early life
John W. Daniels was born on February 23, 1857, in Piqua, Ohio.

Career
Daniels first worked for a linseed company in Piqua. He joined American Linseed Co. in Buffalo, New York, and later became the manager of a linseed factory in Cleveland, Ohio.

Daniels founded Daniels Linseed Co. in Minneapolis, Minnesota in 1902. With George A. Archer, Daniels co-founded Archer-Daniels in 1904. When they purchased Midland Linseed Products Co. in 1912, it became known as Archer Daniels Midland. Daniels served as its chairman.

Personal life and death
Daniels had a wife and a son, Thomas L. Daniels. They resided at Kenwood Parkway in St. Paul, Minnesota as well as in White Bear Lake, Minnesota. Daniels had an affinity for art and collected art works.

Daniels died on June 8, 1931, in St. Paul, Minnesota, at the age of 74. His funeral was held in Piqua, Ohio.

References

1857 births
1931 deaths
People from Piqua, Ohio
People from Saint Paul, Minnesota
Archer Daniels Midland people
19th-century American businesspeople
American company founders
American art collectors